Arkadiusz Aleksander (born 19 April 1980, in Nowy Sącz) is a retired Polish footballer.

Career

In 2015, Aleksander signed for Sandecja Nowy Sącz.

References

 

1980 births
Living people
Polish footballers
Śląsk Wrocław players
Górnik Zabrze players
Odra Wodzisław Śląski players
Association football forwards
Arka Gdynia players
Nea Salamis Famagusta FC players
Sandecja Nowy Sącz players
Flota Świnoujście players
Olimpia Grudziądz players
Ekstraklasa players
I liga players
Polish expatriate footballers
Expatriate footballers in Cyprus
Cypriot Second Division players
Sportspeople from Nowy Sącz